Ustrzyki Górne (Ustryky Horišni) is a village in the administrative district of Gmina Lutowiska, within Bieszczady County, Subcarpathian Voivodeship, in south-eastern Poland, close to the border with Ukraine.

The village has a population of 114.

There is a town with a similar name called Ustrzyki Dolne, which is located some 45 km to the north. Dolne means Lower, while Górne means Upper.

References

Villages in Bieszczady County